Takydromus is a genus of lizards, commonly called grass lizards or oriental racers.  Species of the genus Takydromus are endemic to a large part of Asia. Members of this genus are noticeable because of their slender appearance and their agile movements. The word takydromus derives from Greek ταχυδρόμος (takhudromos), "fast-running", from ταχύς (takhus), "swift" + δρόμος (dromos), "course, race".

Description
Members of the genus Takydromus are extremely slender in appearance. The tail is about 2 to 5 times as long as the snout-vent length. The basic colour is normally brown, often with lateral stripes and dark spots. The dorsal scales are keeled and large. These keels form continuous longitudinal rows. The toes contain lamellae. The collar may be reduced or completely absent.

Distribution and habitat
The lizard genus Takydromus is found in Japan, in the Amur region of Russia, and throughout entire eastern Asia to Indonesia. These lizards are mainly terrestrial although some species can be found on trees. Some members of this genus are found both on rocks and in relatively damp forests. Other species inhabit open grasslands.

Reproduction
Females of species of Takydromus lay 1–10 eggs per clutch and up to 6 clutches per year.

Species
The genus Takydromus belongs to the lizard subfamily Lacertinae, tribe Lacertini, and contains the following species:
Takydromus albomaculosus 
Takydromus amurensis  – Amur grass lizard
Takydromus dorsalis  – Sakishima grass lizard
Takydromus formosanus  – Formosa grass lizard 
Takydromus hani  – southeast Asian green grass lizard
Takydromus haughtonianus  – Goalpara grass lizard
Takydromus hsuehshanensis   
Takydromus intermedius 
Takydromus khasiensis  – Java grass lizard, Khasi Hills long-tailed lizard 
Takydromus kuehnei 
Takydromus luyeanus 
Takydromus madaensis  – Ma Da grass lizard
Takydromus sauteri  – Koshun grass lizard
Takydromus septentrionalis  – China grass lizard
Takydromus sexlineatus  – Asian grass lizard, six-striped long-tailed grass lizard, long-tailed grass lizard
Takydromus sikkimensis  – Sikkim grass lizard
Takydromus smaragdinus  – green grass lizard
Takydromus stejnegeri 
Takydromus sylvaticus  – Chung-an ground lizard
Takydromus tachydromoides  – Japanese grass lizard
Takydromus toyamai  – Miyako grass lizard 
Takydromus viridipunctatus 
Takydromus wolteri  – mountain grass lizard
Takydromus yunkaiensis  – Yunkai grass lizard

Nota bene: A binomial authority in parentheses indicates that the species was originally described in a genus other than Takydromus.

References

Further reading
Daudin FM (1802). Histoire Naturelle, Générale et Particulière des Reptiles; Ouvrage faisant suite à l'Histoire Naturelle générale et particulière, composée par Leclerc Buffon; et rédigée par C.S. Sonnini, membre de plusieurs sociétés savantes. Tome troisième [Volume 3]. Paris: F. Dufart. 452 pp. (Takydromus, new genus, pp. 251–252). (in French).
Lin S-M, Chen CA, Lue K-Y (2002). Molecular Phylogeny and Biogeography of the Grass Lizard Genus Takydromus (Reptilia: Lacertidae) of East Asia. Molecular Phylogenetics and Evolution 22 (2): 276–288. Erratum, 26 (2): 333.
Smith MA (1935). The Fauna of British India, Including Ceylon and Burma. Reptilia and Amphibia. Vol. II.—Sauria. London: Secretary of State for India in Council. (Taylor and Francis, printers). xiii + 440 pp. + Plate I + 2 maps. (Genus Takydromus, p. 365).

 
Taxa named by François Marie Daudin
Lizard genera